The Midden Halt is a request stop on the Wells and Walsingham Light Railway which serves a camp site.

References
 
 

Heritage railway stations in Norfolk